Mount Paterson is a mountain, 2,195 m, standing 2 miles (3.2 km) north-northwest of Mount Carse in the Salvesen Range of South Georgia. Surveyed by the SGS in the period 1951–57, and named for Stanley B. Paterson, assistant surveyor of the SGS, 1955–56.

Mountains and hills of South Georgia